The Bishop of Crediton is an episcopal title which takes its name from the town of Crediton in Devon, England. The title was originally used by the Anglo-Saxons in the 10th and 11th centuries for a diocese covering Devon and Cornwall. It is now used by the Church of England as the title of a suffragan bishop who assists the diocesan Bishop of Exeter.

List of bishops suffragan
The present Bishop of Crediton is a title used by a Church of England suffragan bishop who, along with the Bishop of Plymouth, assists the diocesan Bishop of Exeter in overseeing the Diocese of Exeter.

References

External links
 

 
Diocese of Exeter
Anglican suffragan bishops in the Diocese of Exeter
Christianity in Devon